Stellite is a range of cobalt-chromium alloys designed for wear resistance. The alloys may also contain tungsten or molybdenum and a small, but important, amount of carbon.

History
Stellite is a trademarked name of Kennametal Inc. Prior to that it was owned by Union Carbide, Stellite Division. Invented by Elwood Haynes in the early 1900s as a material for making cutlery that wouldn't stain or require constant cleaning.

Composition
Stellite alloys are a range of cobalt-based alloys, with significant proportions of chromium (up to 33%) and tungsten (up to 18%). Some of the alloys also contain nickel or molybdenum. Most of them are fairly high carbon content when compared to carbon steels, though they contain less than 3% iron, and in the stellite alloys the carbon is primarily associated with the chromium to form hard chromium carbide particles which are dispersed in the cobalt-based matrix.

Properties
Stellite is a family of completely non-magnetic and corrosion-resistant cobalt alloys of various compositions that have been optimised for different uses. The alloy currently most suited for cutting tools, for example, is Stellite 100, because this alloy is quite hard, maintains a good cutting edge at high temperature, and resists hardening and annealing. Other alloys are formulated to maximize combinations of wear resistance, corrosion resistance, or ability to withstand extreme temperatures.

Stellite alloys display outstanding hardness and toughness, and are also usually very resistant to corrosion.  Typically, a Stellite part is precisely cast so that only minimal machining is necessary. Due to the very high hardness many alloys of Stellite are primarily machined by grinding, as cutting operations in some alloys cause significant tool wear even with carbide inserts.  The alloys also tend to have extremely high melting points due to the cobalt and chromium content.

Applications
Typical applications include saw teeth, hardfacing, and acid-resistant machine parts. Stellite was a major improvement in the production of poppet valves and valve seats for the valves, particularly exhaust valves, of internal combustion engines. By reducing their erosion from hot gases, the interval between maintenance and re-grinding of their seats was dramatically lengthened. Stellite was also used in some engines for the cam followers, particularly by the Norton Motorcycle Company.

The first third of the M2HB machine gun and M60 machine gun barrels (starting from the chamber) are lined with Stellite. The locking lugs and shoulders of Voere Titan II rifles were also made of Stellite. In the early 1980s, experiments were done in the United Kingdom to make artificial hip joints and other bone replacements out of precision-cast Stellite alloys. It is also widely used for making the cast structure of dental prostheses.

Stellite has also been used in the manufacture of turning tools for lathes. With the introduction and improvements in tipped tools it is not used as often, but it was found to have superior cutting properties compared to the early carbon steel tools and even some high-speed steel tools, especially against difficult materials such as stainless steel. Care was needed in grinding the blanks and these were marked at one end to show the correct orientation, without which the cutting edge could chip prematurely.

While Stellite remains the material of choice for certain internal parts in industrial process valves (valve seat hardfacing), its use has been discouraged in nuclear power plants. In piping that can communicate with the reactor, tiny amounts of Stellite would be released into the process fluid and eventually enter the reactor. There the cobalt would be activated by the neutron flux in the reactor and become cobalt-60, a radioisotope with a five year half life that releases very energetic gamma rays. This phenomenon is more problematic in boiling water reactor (BWR) plants, since the steam is in direct contact with both the reactor and the steam turbine. Pressurized water reactor (PWR) designs are less susceptible.  While not a hazard to the general public, about a third to a half of nuclear worker exposures could be traced to the use of Stellite and to trace amounts of cobalt in stainless steels. Replacements for Stellite have been developed by the industry, such as the Electric Power Research Institute's "NOREM", that provide acceptable performance without cobalt. Since the United States nuclear power industry has begun to replace the Stellite valve seat hardfacing in the late 1970s and to tighten specifications of cobalt in stainless steels, worker exposures due to cobalt-60 have dropped significantly.

Stellite was also used as the cage material for the first commercially available artificial heart valve, the Starr-Edwards caged-ball valve, first implanted in 1960.

Varieties
 Talonite is an alloy similar to Stellite which has been hot-rolled and hardened in a particular manner, to provide a combination of hardness, wear resistance and machinability. Not all Stellite alloys respond to this rolling process.
 Vitallium, used for dentistry and medical implants.

Notes

External links
 Stellite - Kennametal 
 Deloro Group

Cobalt alloys
Chromium alloys